Thiochrome (TChr)is a tricyclic organic compound that arises from the oxidation of the vitamin thiamine. Being highly fluorescent, it is often the derivative that is quantified in the analysis of thiamine.  The oxidation can be effected with ceric ammonium nitrate, hydrogen peroxide, and related reagents.  Hydrolysis of thiamine can yield a thiol derivative (TSH), which is also susceptible to oxidation to the disulfide (TSST).

References

 
Primary alcohols
Thiazoles
Heterocyclic compounds with 3 rings